Russia Jet Direct was a short-lived regularly scheduled airline offering passenger transportation, including Hot Shot Cargo and Rapid Document Service, between the United States and the Russian Far East. The airline was American-operated.  It was based in Seattle, Washington.

The fleet consisted of Boeing 757-200ER aircraft from Ryan International Airlines. Russia Jet Direct flew the only direct route from Houston and Anchorage to Sakhalin Island-Yuzhno.

Russia Jet Direct operated between August and September 2005. The former principals hoped to relaunch the airline as Saber Air.

On January 7, 2007, the flight information display at Ted Stevens Anchorage International Airport displayed a Russia Jet Direct flight arriving from Oakland, California.

See also 
 List of defunct airlines of the United States

References

Defunct airlines of the United States
Airlines established in 2005
Airlines disestablished in 2005